Lari is the surname of:

 Abdolvahed Mousavi Lari (born 1954), Iranian Shia cleric and reformist politician
 Adil Lari, Austrian architect
 Ahmed Lari (born 1955), Kuwaiti politician
 Dario Lari (born 1979), Italian rower
 Egidio Lari (1882–1965), Italian Catholic prelate
 Farinaz Lari (born 1987), Iranian kickboxer
 Ghazala Lari, Indian politician
 Leonida Lari (1949–2011), Romanian poet, journalist and politician
 Mujtaba Musavi Lari (1925–2013), Iranian Islamic scholar
 Ovidio Lari (1919–2007), Italian Catholic ordinary and bishop
 Yasmeen Lari (born c. 1941), Pakistan's first female architect
 Zahra Lari, Emirati figure skater